ProductCenter is a commercial software product, that is an integrated suite of Product Lifecycle Management (PLM) software for managing product data. The software was engineered for the Microsoft Windows and UNIX operating systems. Along with core applications, it includes localized and web-based services. ProductCenter is suited for managing various types of CAx data, but it can be used for many forms of data management and product management.

History
ProductCenter is owned, supported and maintained by SofTech Group Inc. In the early 1990s ProductCenter was one of the earliest PDM/PLM engineering software programs known as CMS.  CMS was developed by Workgroup Technology Corporation (WTC) and was the first independent PDM/PLM solution to integrate with Pro/ENGINEER and Myriad. In 1996 WTC's CMS software program was renamed to what is currently known as ProductCenter.

Product version timeline
 2019 - ProductCenter 9.9
 2018 - ProductCenter 9.8
 2017 - ProductCenter 9.7
 2016 - ProductCenter 9.6
 2015 - ProductCenter 9.5
 2014 - ProductCenter 9.4
 2013 - ProductCenter 9.3
 2012 - ProductCenter 9.2
 2012 – ProductCenter 9.1
 2009 – ProductCenter 9
 2008 – ProductCenter 8.6
 2007 – ProductCenter 8.6
 2006 – ProductCenter 8.5
 2005 – ProductCenter 8.4
 2004 – ProductCenter 8.3
 2003 – ProductCenter 8.2
 2002 – ProductCenter 8.1
 2001 – ProductCenter 8.0
 2000 – ProductCenter 7.0
 1999 – ProductCenter 7.0 (formerly CMS)
 1998 – CMS 6.5
 1996 – CMS 6
 1994 – CMS 5

Product features
ProductCenter makes the use of spreadsheets for BOM management obsolete and provides organization for parts with various part types and attributes as well as all information managed can be accessed through the ProductCenter Hierarchy Explorer.  This feature helps to facilitate small to mid-size manufacturers with a way to centralize product data, control the engineering change process and share BOMs with suppliers. ProductCenter can be integrated with other tools – like CAD, ECAD, CAM, PDM and ERP – to help ease the management of product data from design to manufacturing.

ProductCenter includes these and other features:

 Bill of Information Management
 BOM Management
 Workflow Management
 Change Management (e.g. ECO's)
 Document Control and Versioning
 Compliance Management (e.g. U.S. Food and Drug Administration (FDA), ISO, RoHS, UL and others)
 Supplier & Partner Management
 Supply Chain Collaboration
 Project Collaboration
 Document Management is a component of ProductCenter that centralizes and connects many forms of product information. This component offers secure, distributed vaulting, access via the Web, version and revision control, and user customized Web Portals for the engineer.  The component also offers engineers viewable file generation, and automated legacy data capture.
 Design Integration is a component of ProductCenter that integrates directly with design and support applications. The component offers many installable application modules for most of the current major commercial CAD and support products. Those applications include AutoCAD, Adobe FrameMaker, Autodesk Inventor, AutoCAD Mechanical, AutoCAD Electrical, Microsoft Office, SolidWorks, CATIA V5, and Siemens PLM Software's NX.  This component helped users to solve many repetitive tasks associated with integrations to ProductCenter's PLM solution by allowing the user fast access to the data being managed.
 Configuration Control is a component of ProductCenter that provides standard organization for parts with various part types and attributes. All information is managed and accessible through the ProductCenter Hierarchy Explorer and ProductCenter BOM Editor. This component consolidates and links every information item used to design, produce, and support product data for the end user or engineer.
 Process Management is a component of ProductCenter that standardizes and automates product development and release processes across a company or enterprise. The component allows for process automation including document approvals and release, email notification, engineering change management and regulatory compliance. The module known as ProductCenter Workflow automates business processes such as design and change approvals keeping in check with regulatory requirements such as U.S. Food and Drug Administration and ISO.
 Product Collaboration is a component of ProductCenter that facilitates design reviews and collaborative product team meetings over the Web.  This component stores document markups and links to original files in ProductCenter. It also allows for 3D visualization and View/Markup of numerous file formats.
 Enterprise Integration is a component of ProductCenter that enables the exchange of application-independent Bill of materials with other enterprise applications such as Material requirements planning, Enterprise resource planning, and Customer relationship management systems.

See also
 Bill of materials
 Engineering Change Order
 Product Lifecycle Management
 Product Data Management
 Manufacturing process management
 Product design
 Configuration management

External links 
 Official
Company Web site: ProductCenter PLM

 News
Garoup's_ProductCenter_PLM_Solution_for_Inventor_2011 Autodesk Certifies SofTech Group's ProductCenter PLM Solution for Inventor 2011
SofTech's ProductCenter® PLM 9.0: Focusing on an Improved User Experience
Group’s_ProductCenter_PLM_Solution/ Hayward Tyler, Inc. Selects SofTech Group's ProductCenter PLM Solution

References 

Business software
Product lifecycle management
Engineering companies of the United States
Defunct software companies of the United States